Shahla Habibi (1958—6 September 2017) was Iran's Presidential Advisor on Women's Affairs from 1995 to 1999. She was former member of central council of Islamic Coalition Party.

Career

Presidential advisor
In 1995, President Rafsanjani appointed Shahla Habibi as Iran's Presidential Advisor on Women's Affairs.

Female Representation of the Iranian Government
Shahla Habibi's position would later become a cabinet position under President Khatami.  This post was later held by Zahra Shojaei under President Khatami, and by Nasrin Soltankhah during President Mahmoud Ahmadinejad's administration.

Islamic Republic of Iran Women's News Agency
The Islamic Republic of Iran Women's News Agency (IWNA) was created in the 1990s to meet the information needs of Iranian women.  She became the IWNA Director.

References

External links
RFE/RL Iran report
Iran's Presidential Advisor on Women's Affairs, Shahla Habibi
https://alightmotionguru.com/habibi-capcut-template/

20th-century Iranian women politicians
20th-century Iranian politicians
1958 births
2017 deaths
Presidential advisers of Iran
Islamic Coalition Party politicians